Events in the year 2013 in Kosovo.

Incumbents 
 President: Atifete Jahjaga
 Prime Minister: Hashim Thaçi

Events 
Ongoing – North Kosovo crisis (2011–2013)
 19 April – The Brussels Agreement (2013) is signed between representatives of Kosovo and Serbia, ending the two year long North Kosovo crisis. The 15-point document granted devolved powers to North Kosovo regarding economic development, education, healthcare and urban planning, and several mechanisms that allowed a certain autonomy in justice, policing and electoral matters.
 3 November – Two American missionaries from the Church of Jesus Christ of Latter-day Saints (LDS) were attacked in the nation by a group of known Albanian Islamic terrorists in Pristina. Both missionaries made a full recovery.

See also 

 2013 in Europe

References 

 
Kosovo
Kosovo
2010s in Kosovo
Years of the 21st century in Kosovo